After the founding of the Republic of China, Guangxi served as the base for one of the most powerful warlord cliques of China: the Old Guangxi Clique.  Led by Lu Rongting (陆荣廷), the clique was able to take control of neighbouring Hunan and Guangdong provinces as well. Along with the Yunnan clique, they formed the core of opposition to Yuan Shikai's monarchist ambitions during the National Protection War.  With Yunnan and Sun Yat-sen's Chinese Revolutionary Party, they started the Constitutional Protection Movement. They quickly came to disagree with Sun and squeezed him out of power. Sun, Chen Jiongming, and the Yunnan clique defeated them in the Guangdong-Guangxi War. The Old Guangxi Clique crumbled in the early 1920s, and was replaced by the pro-Sun New Guangxi Clique.

See also
Warlord era
List of Warlords

1911 establishments in China
1922 disestablishments in China
Warlord cliques in Republican China
Republic of China warlords from Guangxi